Staraya Kudeyevka (İśke Köźöy) is a rural locality (a village) in Nadezhdinsky Selsoviet, Iglinsky District, Bashkortostan, Russia. The population was 34 as of 2010. There is 1 street.

Geography 
Staraya Kudeyevka is located 44 km east of Iglino (the district's administrative centre) by road. Kudeyevsky is the nearest rural locality.

References 

Rural localities in Iglinsky District